is a 2001 Japanese film directed by Shin Togashi based on the novel Hi-baransu by Naoko Uozumi which won the author the Kodansha Award for New Writers of Children's Literature.

Cast
 Megumi Hatachiya as Chiaki
 Fumiyo Kohinata as Kiku-chan
 Yu Hatano as Mizue
 Momoka Nakamura as Yukari
 Shūji Kashiwabara as Heath
 Tomato as Yuri-chan
 Kumiko Tsuchiya as Homeroom Teacher
 Ryūshi Mizukami as Video Store Clerk
 Masayo Umezawa as Mizue's Mother
 Noriko Hayami as Masayoshi's Wife
 Mieko Harada as Chiaki's Mother

Awards
23rd Yokohama Film Festival
Won: Best New Director - Shin Togashi
10th Best Film

References

External links
 
 

2001 films
Films directed by Shin Togashi
2000s Japanese films